Edwinstree was a judicial and taxation subdivision (a "hundred") of Hertfordshire, in the east of the county, that existed from the 10th to the 19th century.

It comprised the following parishes: Albury, Anstey, Aspeden, Barkway, Barley, Brent Pelham, Buckland, Buntingford, Furneaux Pelham, Great Hormead, Layston, Little Hadham, Little Hormead, Meesden, Much Hadham, Stocking Pelham, Throcking,  Wakeley and Wyddiall.

The hundred meeting point was at an open-air site called Meeting Field in Furneaux Pelham. The name suggests it was near a tree called "Edwin's Tree". An alternative name of Eddiford appears in a 14th-century record and may refer to an adjacent crossing of the River Ash. 

The area was settled by the Saxon tribe called the Brahingas and became part of the area of the Middle Saxons within the Kingdom of Essex. When Christianity was introduced into Essex in 604, Edwinstree and Braughing hundreds became part of the Archdeaconry of Middlesex within the Diocese of East Saxons.

References 

Hundreds of Hertfordshire